Esme Hester Johanna Kruger (born 29 November 1971) is a South African international lawn bowler.

Bowls career
She was born in Pretoria, South Africa and was selected as part of the South African team for the 2018 Commonwealth Games on the Gold Coast in Queensland where she claimed a silver medal in the Fours with Elma Davis, Johanna Snyman and Nicolene Neal.

She won the 2018 singles title at the South African National Bowls Championships bowling for the Christian Brothers Collage Old Boys(CBCOB)Bowls Club. This was her second title after previously winning the fours in 2012.

In 2019 she won the fours silver medal and triples bronze medal at the Atlantic Bowls Championships and in 2020 she was selected for the 2020 World Outdoor Bowls Championship in Australia.

In 2021, she won the women's fours title and finished runner-up in the pairs at the South African National Bowls Championships bowling for the Christian Brothers College Old Boys (CBCOB) Bowls Club. This was her third national title.

In 2022, she competed in the women's triples and the Women's fours at the 2022 Commonwealth Games. In the fours the team of Johanna Snyman, Thabelo Muvhango and Bridget Calitz reached the final and won a silver medal after losing in the final 17-10 to India.

References

1971 births
Living people
Sportspeople from Pretoria
Bowls players at the 2018 Commonwealth Games
Bowls players at the 2022 Commonwealth Games
Commonwealth Games silver medallists for South Africa
Commonwealth Games medallists in lawn bowls
South African female bowls players
Medallists at the 2018 Commonwealth Games
Medallists at the 2022 Commonwealth Games